154 (Scottish) Regiment is a regiment of the British Army's Royal Logistic Corps. It forms part of the Army Reserve. Its role is to provide general transport support at 'third line' for the British Army.

History
The regiment was formed as the 154th (Lowland) Regiment, RCT (Volunteers) in Glasgow in 1967. The initially comprised just 221 Squadron and 222 Squadron. 225 Squadron was formed in 1969, 251 Squadron in 1971 and 225 Squadron in 1992. 527 Squadron, 230 Squadron and 231 Squadron and 251 Squadron were added on amalgamation with 153 (Highland) Transport Regiment to form the Scottish Transport Regiment in 1993. 231 Squadron was subsequently disbanded. It became 154 (Scottish) Regiment RLC under the Army 2020 reforms and an extra squadron, 239 Squadron, was formed in 2016.

Structure
The regiment's structure is:
Regimental Headquarters, in Dunfermline
527 Headquarters Squadron, in Dunfermline
221 Transport Squadron, in Glasgow
230 Transport Squadron, in Edinburgh
239 Transport Squadron, in Fife
251 Transport Squadron, in Irvine

Uniform
The regiment wears the Tactical Recognition Flash of the Royal Logistic Corps. The tartan of the regiment is the MacDuff.

References

External links
154 (Scottish) Regiment RLC 

Regiments of the Royal Logistic Corps
Military units and formations established in 1993
1993 establishments in the United Kingdom